Leo Henry Carroll (born February 16, 1944) is a former American football defensive end in the National Football League for the Green Bay Packers and the Washington Redskins.  He played college football at the University of Tulsa, San Diego State University and Glendale Community College.  Carroll was drafted in the second round of the 1967 NFL Draft by the Atlanta Falcons

Leo was the owner of Carroll's Brake Service in Alhambra, CA, as was his father before him, and now his sons.
He graduated from Emery Park Elementary in Alhambra in 1958 and Alhambra High School in 1962.

References

1944 births
Living people
American football defensive ends
Green Bay Packers players
Washington Redskins players
San Diego State Aztecs football players
Sportspeople from Alhambra, California
Tulsa Golden Hurricane football players
Glendale Vaqueros football players